The Barton Mountains are a group of mountains located south of the Commonwealth Range and the Hughes Range and bounded by Keltie Glacier, Brandau Glacier, Leigh Hunt Glacier, and Snakeskin Glacier, in the Queen Maud Mountains. They were mapped by the United States Geological Survey from surveys and from U.S. Navy aerial photographs, 1958–63.

The mountains were named by the Advisory Committee on Antarctic Names after Lieutenant Commander Walter H. Barton, U.S. Navy, officer in charge of the Squadron VXE-6 detachment at Beardmore South Camp in the 1985–86 field season. Lieutenant Commander Barton developed, coordinated, and executed the logistical plan for this large and remote camp, which was in operation for 78 days and required over 800 flight hours in support of research in the Beardmore Glacier area.

Features
Geographical features include:

 Graphite Peak
 Mount Clarke
 Mount Usher
 Tricorn Mountain

References
 

Mountain ranges of the Ross Dependency
Dufek Coast